Lategan is a surname. Notable people with the surname include:

Barry Lategan (born 1935), South Africa-born British fashion and portrait photographer
Tjol Lategan (1925–2015), South African rugby union player
Waldo Lategan (born 1989), South African cricketer